The  of Japan covers matters concerning the establishment, management, and sharing of airport costs, and contribute to promoting development of civil aviation. The Airport Development Law was significantly revised on June 18, 2008, and renamed the Airport Law.

External links 
 Text in 1996 (The Nippon Foundation Library)

Japanese legislation
1956 in law
Aviation in Japan
Aviation law